William Eugene Bedford (December 2, 1896 in Dallas, Texas – October 6, 1977 in San Antonio, Texas) was a second baseman for the Cleveland Indians and end for the Rochester Jeffersons. In two games with the Indians, he went 0-for-3 with a run scored.

Sources

 

1896 births
1977 deaths
SMU Mustangs baseball players
Cleveland Indians players
Baseball players from Dallas
Major League Baseball second basemen
Centre Colonels football players
Rochester Jeffersons players
American football ends